Elstra (Sorbian: Halštrow) is a town in the district of Bautzen, in Saxony, Germany. It is situated on the river Schwarze Elster, 6 kilometres southeast of Kamenz, and 34 kilometres northeast of Dresden. The name "Elstra" stems from the river Schwarze Elster, which rises in the district Kindisch.

The city has only about 2,000 citizens and is one of the smallest cities in Germany. The whole municipality has 2,807 citizens (in 2016). It is part of the officially recognized Sorbian settlement area.

Due to the town name's similarity to the word "Elster" (German for magpie), magpies are often used in the town's self-identity.

Personalities 

 Georg Derlitzki (1889-1958), important agricultural scientist and economist
 Karl Schön (1923-1994), politician (SPD), born in Elstra
 Otto Garten (1902-2000), artist, born in Elstra
 Karl Eberhard (1820-1907), architect

References 

West Lusatia
Populated places in Bautzen (district)